Ponezumab is a humanized monoclonal antibody designed for the treatment of Alzheimer's disease.

Ponezumab was developed by Pfizer Inc.
In November 2011 Pfizer halted the development of ponezumab after finishing a phase 2 trial.

References 

Pfizer brands
Treatment of Alzheimer's disease
Experimental drugs